The House on Sorority Row (also known as House of Evil in the United Kingdom) is a 1982 American slasher film written and directed by Mark Rosman, produced by John G. Clark, and starring Eileen Davidson and Kathryn McNeil. The plot follows a group of sorority sisters being stalked and murdered during their graduation party after they conceal a fatal prank against their house mother.

Partly inspired by the 1955 French film Les Diaboliques, first-time writer-director Rosman wrote the screenplay for the film in 1980, then titled Seven Sisters. The film was shot on location in Pikesville, Maryland in the summer months of 1980, with additional photography taking place in Los Angeles.

In November 1982, it received a limited regional theatrical release before expanding on January 21, 1983. The following week it rose to number one, eventually going on to gross $10.6 million at the box office. Despite a mixed critical response on release, the film has obtained a large cult following among fans of the genre since its release.

The House on Sorority Row was named one of the greatest slasher films of all time by Complex in 2017. A remake, titled Sorority Row, was released in 2009.

Plot
Seven sorority sisters  Katey, Vicki, Liz, Jeanie, Diane, Morgan, and Stevie  celebrate their graduation ceremony at their sorority house, located at the far end of a sorority row. 

Their celebration is interrupted by their domineering house mother, Mrs. Slater, who denies the girls' plan to throw a graduation party. The girls, led by Vicki—scorned because Slater slashed her waterbed when Vicki covertly brought a boyfriend into the sorority house—devise a prank: They steal her walking cane and place it in the house's unused outdoor pool and force her at gunpoint to retrieve it. The prank goes awry when Vicki inadvertently shoots Slater, who appears to be dead, the girls try to erase their fatal mistake by trying to desperately give her as much medical attention as possible, such as Stevie giving her two breaths but to no avail due to Slater already being dead, Katie on the other hand suggests an ambulance but could not because they'll attract witnesses. The girls agree to hide the body in the pool until their party ends, though Katey and Jeanie are reluctant.

At the party, an unidentified figure uses Slater's cane to stab a man walking in the woods. Meanwhile, after finding guests attempting to enter the pool, the girls realize that if the pool lights turn on, Slater's body will be revealed. Stevie goes into the basement to disable the breaker, where she is brutally stabbed to death by the killer. Later, the pool lights come on much to the girls' alarm, but Slater's body is nowhere to be found.

Deciding that Slater must be alive, the girls begin searching for her after the party comes to a close. Morgan enters Slater's room where Slater's body falls on her from the attic hatch. Vicki suggests hiding the body in the old cemetery. In the attic, Katey discovers children's toys and a dead caged bird. Morgan is subsequently stabbed with Slater's cane in her bedroom.

Diane goes to an outlying garage to start the van to transport Slater's body, but is murdered by the killer who breaks in through the sunroof. Shortly after, Jeanie is decapitated with a butcher knife in the bathroom. Meanwhile, Katey finds a medical alert tag on a necklace belonging to Slater. She calls the number and is put through to a Dr. Beck, who comes to the house. The two discover the bodies of Stevie, Morgan, and Diane in the pool. Meanwhile, after finding Diane missing, Vicki and Liz decide to drive to the cemetery without her to bury Slater's body. When they arrive, both girls are killed by the assailant. Dr. Beck accompanies Katey to the cemetery, where they find the bodies of Vicki and Liz, as well as Slater's body still in the back of the van.

After forcibly giving Katey a sedative at the house, Dr. Beck reveals that Slater had a son named Eric who was deformed and mentally underdeveloped thanks to an illegal fertility treatment he had given her. Dr. Beck uses Katey as bait so he can capture Eric and cover up his crime. Eric arrives and hacks Dr. Beck to death while Katey searches for Vicki's gun, which does not fire. She flees to the bathroom and finds Jeanie's severed head in the toilet. Horrified, she climbs to the attic where she is attacked by Eric, now wearing a clown costume. She shoots him repeatedly, only to realize the gun is loaded with blanks. She then uses a pin to stab Eric numerous times and he falls through the attic door to the floor below. Katey believes he is dead and rests from exhaustion. However, Eric opens his eyes as the film ends, leaving Katey's fate unknown.

Cast

Production

Screenplay
Writer-director Mark Rosman, who had attended the University of California, Los Angeles (UCLA) and later graduated from New York University, got the idea for The House on Sorority Row after returning to his hometown in Los Angeles. Rosman had been a fraternity member at UCLA, which he used as a partial basis for writing the screenplay, which focused on a group of sorority sisters who find their lives threatened after covering up a fatal prank. Some elements of the film, primarily the usage of a pool to conceal their crime, were inspired by Les Diaboliques (1955), a French suspense film directed by Henri-Georges Clouzot. He later stated he envisioned a suspense film in which "the female characters would not just be victimsthe whole idea of it was that they were culpable, and that they were sort of bringing this on themselves". The screenplay had several working titles, including Screamer and Seven Sisters. Rosman initially accrued $125,000 as a starting budget, with the help of a friend who worked for VAE Productions, an independent studio that specialized in documentaries, based in Washington, D.C.

Casting
The majority of the casting for The House on Sorority Row took place in New York City, though Eileen Davidson and Janis Zido were cast out of the Los Angeles area. Davidson recalled auditioning at Rosman's house in Beverly Hills. Kate McNeil, who was cast in the role of Katey, won the part while still attending graduate courses in New York City.

Harley Jane Kozak recalled attending a casting call in a "warehouse in Manhattan" and receiving a phone call several weeks later with the news that she had won the part. Lois Kelso Hunt, who portrays the cantankerous housemother, was a local stage actress cast out of Washington, D.C.

Filming
The House on Sorority Row  was the directorial debut of director Rosman as well as the first feature film of cinematographer Tim Suhrstedt. Both had met while working as assistant directors on Brian De Palma's Home Movies (1980). Filming took place on location in Pikesville, Maryland, with establishing campus shots at the University of Maryland, in the summer of 1981. The production had originally been slated to shoot in Washington, D.C., where the production company was located. However, Rosman found the house location featured in the film in Pikesville, which was in foreclosure, allowing the crew to film for a low cost. Upon arriving at the house to shoot, the crew found two squatters living in the house, who they allowed to work as video assistants. Vincent Perronio, a frequent collaborator with John Waters, agreed to serve as the film's production designer, and dressed the entire house to appear as a sorority.

The budget for the film was $300,000. However, the production ran out of funds midway through filming, and Rosman had to secure a loan from a cousin in Los Angeles in order to complete the film. Throughout principal photography, the cast stayed at Koinonia, a farm retreat in Pikesville where they lived together in "dorm-like" conditions. The film was a non-Screen Actors Guild production, and Kozak and McNeil both recall receiving $50 per diem compensation for their days on set.  
 
While principal photography occurred exclusively in Maryland, additional transitional shots and pickups were completed in Los Angeles. Among these included the shot of Davidson's character being impaled through the eye with the cane.

Post-production
Film Ventures International, an independent distributor, purchased the film for distribution after principal photography was complete, and also gave the filmmakers an additional $125,000 to complete post-production (the majority of which went toward scoring and mixing the film). In an interview with director Mark Rosman, it was revealed that Lois Kelso Hunt's performance is entirely dubbed, as her natural speaking voice was deemed not "scary" enough for the role of Mrs. Slater. While her demeanor and performance were apt, Rosman found her voice not as husky as he had envisioned.

According to Rosman, Film Ventures requested two changes to the final cut of the film: The first was that the opening flashback scene, which was shot in black and white, be colorized; the sequence was then color-tinted to be black and blue. The second change was in regards to the original ending. In the director's original ending, Katherine is discovered floating dead in the pool, apparently Eric's final victim. Film Ventures felt the ending too downbeat, so as a result Katherine survives in the finished version.

Music
The film's music score was written by Richard Band and performed by the London Philharmonic Orchestra, recorded at Wembley Studios. The Washington, D.C.-based powerpop band 4 Out of 5 Doctors appears in the movie, performing several of their songs.

La-La Land Records issued a disc of Band's score in 2015.

Release
The one-sheet poster and advertising were created by Film Ventures International's regular advertising agency, Design Projects Incorporated.  Design Project's owner, Rick Albert art directed the key art and title treatment design. The key art was illustrated by Jack Lynwood, who painted illustrations for many motion picture campaigns during the late 1970s and '80s. The copylines were written by distributor Film Ventures International's Edward L. Montoro.

Initially, Metro-Goldwyn-Mayer expressed interest in distributing the film, but ultimately backed out, after which Film Ventures International bought it for distribution. The House on Sorority Row was given a limited theatrical release on November 19, 1982 in the United States, opening in Albuquerque, New Mexico and Las Vegas, Nevada. The theatrical release expanded to major cities such as Los Angeles on January 21, 1983.

Box office
During its wide release opening weekend in January 1983, the film earned $617,661 showing on 153 screens, ranking a low number 15 at the box office. However, the film jumped to number 1 and grossed nearly $10 million in its second weekend. Its ultimate gross totaled $10,604,986. The film was released in the United Kingdom in December 1983 under the title House of Evil.

Critical response
During a 1982 theatrical run of the film, critic Anthony DellaFlora of the Albuquerque Journal wrote of the film: "[Horror films] are supposed to put you in a state of unmitigated terror. This one does neither. The House on Sorority Row may have brought new meaning to the term "Greek tragedy", but it certainly didn't scare anyone. Mark Rosman, who produced, directed and wrote the alleged thriller must take most of the blame for this". Lou Cedrone of The Baltimore Sun felt that there were "no surprises" or mystery in the film, adding that "the movie, bad as it is, is great fun if you are part of an audience that talks back to it". Stephen Hunter, also of the Baltimore Sun, felt the film was similarly predictable, but noted that "technically, the strongest element in the production is the photography, which is keen-edged, brightly colored and evocative", comparing it to the film of Rainer Werner Fassbinder.

Film scholar Adam Rockoff notes that the film was frequently compared to the films of Brian De Palma upon release, as Rosman had previously worked as an assistant for De Palma. Frank Hagen, published in the Standard-Speaker, favorably compared the film to the works of De Palma and Alfred Hitchcock, adding that it is "cuts above the routine rip-and-slash fare... Rosman knows how to maintain suspense and deliver a shock or two". Kevin Thomas of the Los Angeles Times praised the film as a "skillfully made horror picture that builds suspense and terror in which obligatory gore is presented with surprising restraint", ultimately deeming it a "promising debut from writer-director Rosman". The Daily Presss Henry Edgar echoed this sentiment, writing that the film favors suspense over gore, noting it as a "quality" thriller, and praising the performances of McNeil and Davidson, describing them as "credible" and "cunning, and realistic", respectively.

On the review aggregator website Rotten Tomatoes, The House on Sorority Row holds a 45% approval rating based on 10 reviews, with an average rating of 5.23/10. Film scholar Scott Aaron Stine notes that the film has "competent production values, but this in no way compensates for the rote proceedings". John Kenneth Muir refers to the film as "a textbook example of the 1980s slasher film" that "boasts a devilish sense of humor". Critic Jim Harper notes the film as a moralistic slasher film and probable influence on films such as I Know What You Did Last Summer (1997).

In 2017, Complex included the film in a retrospective of the best slasher films of all time. In a May 2018 retrospective published by Inquisitr, the film was deemed "a disturbing tale of revenge that plays as timely social commentary" and noted it as a horror film that "has stood the test of time".

Home media
Elite Entertainment released The House on Sorority Row on DVD in November 2000. The disc featured the film's original theatrical trailer as a supplementary feature. The DVD was re-printed and released again on November 18, 2003. It was again re-released on January 12, 2010 to commemorate the film's 25th anniversary.

Scorpion Releasing and Katarina's Nightmare Theater released a remastered edition on a 2-disc Blu-ray/DVD combo in January 2011. Scorpion Releasing and Code Red released a new Blu-ray edition on May 11, 2018, featuring a new 2K scan of the original master negative. This edition, sold exclusively online and limited to 1,600 units, features a slipcover and newly commissioned artwork.

Remake
A remake titled Sorority Row was released by Summit Entertainment in 2009. The film was directed by Stewart Hendler, with Mark Rosman, the director of the original, serving as an executive producer. It stars Briana Evigan, Leah Pipes, Rumer Willis, Jamie Chung, Audrina Patridge, Margo Harshman, and Carrie Fisher. The script was rewritten by Josh Stolberg and Pete Goldfinger.

Legacy
In 2017, Complex named The House on Sorority Row the 21st-best slasher film of all time, writing: "The House on Sorority Row is, fortunately, more than just a puberty motivator for young boys. Director Mark Rosman does his best to stage prolonged moments of suspense, approaching the film’s kill scenes with his Hitchcock influences intact". Filmmaker Quentin Tarantino included the film in his inaugural film festival in 1997, screening it alongside other horror films such as Don't Go in the House (1980) and The Beyond (1981).

The House on Sorority Row is mentioned in the film Scream 2, along with four other college-themed slasher films: The Dorm That Dripped Blood, Splatter University, Graduation Day, and Final Exam.

See also
List of horror films set in academic institutions

References

Sources

External links
 
 
 

1983 horror films
1982 horror films
1982 films
1983 films
1980s horror thriller films
1980s slasher films
1982 independent films
1980s mystery films
1980s teen horror films
American teen horror films
1982 directorial debut films
Films about fraternities and sororities
Films about pranks
Films set in 1961
Films set in 1981
Films shot in Baltimore
Films shot in Los Angeles
Films directed by Mark Rosman
Films about mass murder
Films scored by Richard Band
American slasher films
Horror films about clowns
Films about fratricide and sororicide
1983 directorial debut films
1980s English-language films
1980s American films